Sanlih Entertainment Television or Sanlih E-Television (SET) is a nationwide cable TV network operated in Taiwan which was founded in May 1993. It also produces Taiwanese drama that are broadcast on free-to-air channels e.g. Taiwan Television (TTV).

In terms of political orientation, Sanlih leans heavily towards the Pan-Green Coalition.

SET channels
SET currently offers eight subsidiary channels:

SET International (began airing March 2000)
SET Taiwan (began airing December 1996)
SET News (began airing March 1998)
SET Metro (began airing September 1995)
SET Drama (began airing December 1996, relaunched June 2013)
SET iNews (began airing May 2011)
SET Variety (began airing June 2012)
MTV Taiwan (started operating by Sanlih since November 2011)

Productions
 SET Taiwan Productions Drama
 SET Metro Productions Drama

See also
 List of dramas broadcast by Sanlih E-Television
 List of Taiwanese television series
 Sanlih Drama Awards
 SET News

References

External links

 SET official website